Rabah Driassa (19 August 1934 – 8 October 2021) was an Algerian painter and singer interpreting folk music. He was mostly active between the 1950s through 1980s where a number of his songs ("Hizia", "Nejma Qotbia", "El Goumri") became national hits in Algeria.

Biography
Drissa was born in 1934 in Blida. He lost his mother at the age of 12, and his father at 15. Being an orphan with five brothers to help, he started his career by sculpting on glass and working on miniatures. His introduction to the music world happened in 1953, when the radio broadcasting at Khaldoun in Algiers proposed him to sing his own musical composition.

Discography
Rabah Driassa has a rich discography compiled over the years through his career. Among his most famous hits:
 "Ya Lhouta"
 "Ya Tayr Lwarchane"
 "Ya Tafaha"
 "Al Momarida£"
 "Ya Zayr Lemqam"
 "Hizia"
 "Nejma Qotbia"
 "El Goumri"

References

External links
 

1934 births
2021 deaths
20th-century Algerian painters
People from Blida
Male painters
20th-century male artists
20th-century Algerian male singers
21st-century Algerian people